Admiral Forbes may refer to:

Arthur Forbes (Royal Navy officer) (died 1891), British Royal Navy admiral
Charles Forbes (Royal Navy officer) (1880–1960), British Royal Navy admiral
George Forbes, 3rd Earl of Granard (1685–1765), British Royal Navy vice admiral
Ian Forbes (born 1946), British Royal Navy admiral
John Forbes (Royal Navy officer) (1714–1796), British Royal Navy admiral
John Morrison Forbes (1925–2021), British Royal Navy vice admiral

See also
Arthur Forbes-Sempill (1877–1962), British Royal Navy rear admiral